South West Osborn Island is an island off the coast of the Kimberley region in Western Australia.

The island is rugged, composed of massive scree over deep jointed scarp country. It is part of the Osborn Island group which includes, Middle Osborn, Borda, Carlia, Steep Head and Kidney Island as well as West, North and Centre Rock.

The island is home to a small group of fauna including three species of birds, six types of reptile, one species of frog and mammal.

The traditional owners of the area are the Wunambal, whose name for the island is Umpatayi or Umbadayi.

References 

Islands of the Kimberley (Western Australia)
Bonaparte Archipelago